× Bakerara, abbreviated Bak. in the horticultural trade, is the nothogenus for intergeneric hybrids between the orchid genera Brassia, Miltonia, Oncidium and Odontoglossum (Brs. x Milt. x Odm. x Onc.).

References

Orchid nothogenera
Oncidiinae
Historically recognized angiosperm taxa